The 1995 Women's South American Volleyball Club Championship was the 1995 annual edition of the women's volleyball tournament, played by six teams from 3 countries from April 1-8, 1995 in Medellin, Colombia. Among the participants were the Peruvian champion Cristal Bancoper and the vice champions, Juventus Sipesa, Argentinians Racing Club, Universidad Católica from Chile and the host nation were represented by Orgullo Paisa. The Brazilian clubs refused to join the tournament because their tournament was still in play.

Competing clubs

Round robin

|}

|}

Final round

Bracket

Semifinals

|}

3rd place

|}

Final

|}

Final standing

Awards
Best Blocker:  Karin Rodrigues (Juventus Sipesa)

References

International volleyball competitions hosted by Colombia
South America Women's Club Championship
South America Women's Club Championship
South America Women's Club Championship
Women's South American Volleyball Club Championship